Shadow: War of Succession (known in Japan as Shadow Warriors) is a 1994 fighting video game developed and published by Tribeca Digital Studios for the 3DO Interactive Multiplayer.

Gameplay 

Shadow: War of Succession is a fighting game with digitized characters.

Synopsis

Plot

Characters

Development and release

Reception 

Shadow: War of Succession received very negative reviews, with many critics considering it a low-quality "clone" of Mortal Kombat. Next Generation reviewed the game, rating it one star out of five, and stated: "Use the disc as a coaster for your coffee mug - you'll get more use out of it and enjoy it more." In 1997, Electronic Gaming Monthly listed it as the third worst console video game of all time. Internet video game critic James Rolfe called the game the worst of the Mortal Kombat clones in particular highlighting the controls, gameplay, and the lack of fatalities despite the presence of in-game prompts for them.

References

External links
 

1994 video games
3DO Interactive Multiplayer games
3DO Interactive Multiplayer-only games
Fighting games
Multiplayer and single-player video games
Video games developed in the United States